Iroise Dumontheil is a Reader in Cognitive Neuroscience at Birkbeck, University of London and Director of Masters courses in Educational Neuroscience.

Dumontheil was awarded the Spearman Medal from the British Psychological Society in 2015, for her research in the social cognition and executive functions associated with the rostral prefrontal cortex, particularly in adulthood and their development during adolescence.

Selected publications

References 

British women academics
Academics of Birkbeck, University of London
British neuroscientists
British women neuroscientists
Living people
Spearman medal winners
Year of birth missing (living people)
British women non-fiction writers